Mimma Zavoli (born 13 February 1963) is a Sammarinese politician who was elected as Captain Regent of San Marino and served alongside Vanessa D'Ambrosio from 1 April until 1 October 2017.

She was elected to the Grand and General Council in 2012. She was appointed to become the Chairman of the Internal Affairs Commission and member of the Commission of Justice Affairs. She was also appointed to the Council of Twelve and the National Group of Inter-Parliamentary Union. She has a diploma of School of Science and a diploma of Infantile Community Assistant. In 1998, she obtained a mini-graduation to teaching qualifications. She started her career in 1981, working in the kindergarten. Now, she works as Inspector of Labour. She was also an activist from 1977 to 1989 for the Sammarinese Christian Democratic Party.

References

1963 births
Living people
People from Santarcangelo di Romagna
21st-century Italian women politicians
Captains Regent of San Marino
Members of the Grand and General Council
Female heads of state
Italian people of Sammarinese descent
Sammarinese women in politics